Geryon Montes is a mountain range on the planet Mars. The name Geryon Montes is a classical albedo name. This mountain range was approved by International Astronomical Union in 1991.

See also
 List of mountains on Mars

References

External links 
 Gazetteer of Planetary Nomenclature

Mountain ranges on Mars